Telêmaco Borba Cable Car is a gondola lift service operating in the entral region of Telêmaco Borba, Paraná, Brazil.

The cable car runs between Telêmaco Borba and Harmonia (neighborhood). Is managed by the company Klabin.

Opened in 1959, the cable car originally served to transport employees and local residents to a paper mill. The cabin offers a view of the city, the Tibagi River and the Klabin factories. During its existence, the cable car has transported more than 54 million passengers.

See also
Sugarloaf Cable Car

References

Telêmaco Borba
Aerial tramways in Brazil
1959 establishments in Brazil
Transport infrastructure completed in 1959
Transport in Paraná (state)